Mad studies is a field of scholarship, theory, and activism about the lived experiences, history, cultures, and politics about people who may identify as mad, mentally ill, psychiatric survivors, consumers, service users, patients, neurodivergent, and disabled. Mad studies originated from consumer/survivor movements organized in Canada, the United States, the United Kingdom, Australia, and in other parts of the world. The methods for inquiry draw from a number of academic disciplines such as women's studies, critical race studies, indigenous epistemologies, queer studies, psychological anthropology, and ethnography. This field shares theoretical similarities to critical disability studies, psychopolitics, and critical social theory. The academic movement formed, in part, as a response to recovery movements, which many mad studies scholars see as being "co-opted" by mental health systems. In 2021 the first academic journal of Mad Studies, The International Journal of Mad Studies was launched.

Origins and scope 
Richard A. Ingram, a senior research fellow in the School of Disability Studies at Ryerson University (2007), has been credited with coining the phrase "Mad Studies" at the First Regional Graduate/Undergraduate Student Disability Studies Conference at Syracuse University on May 3, 2008. In an academic article entitled "Doing Mad Studies: Making (Non)sense Together," Ingram points to a number of theorists who created the intellectual groundwork for the field, including Nietzsche, Bataille, Blanchot, Deleuze, and Guattari.

In a 2014 Guardian article, Peter Beresford names Canadian scholars at the forefront of this academic field: "Mad studies has been pioneered by Ryerson and York Universities in Toronto, with key figures such as mental health survivors, activists and educators David Reville and Geoffrey Reaume and academics Kathryn Church and Brenda LeFrancois." Journalist Alex Gillis summarizes the spread of mad studies programs in a November 2015 article: "Soon after Ryerson and York launched mad studies courses in the early 2000s, similar courses began in Simon Fraser University’s department of sociology and anthropology, and more recently at Memorial University’s school of social work, Queen’s University’s school of kinesiology and health studies, and the history departments at Trent University and the University of Winnipeg. A few universities in England, Scotland and the Netherlands launched courses in the past two years, using Canadian courses as models."

Some dimensions of this emerging field may include research on the "social construction of 'mental illness, normalizing imperatives of the state and medicine, rapidly expanding nosologies (categories of pathology) for mental illness, collusion(s) of pharmaceutical corporations and professional associations within psychiatry, connections between ecocide and mental stress, psychiatrization of nonhuman animals, representation(s) of madness in media, history of consumer/survivor movement(s), and the rise and fall of mental treatments within scientific, medical, and lay communities."

Mad people have traditionally been excluded from shaping what constitutes expert knowledge about themselves. Mad-positive pedagogies often center on ways Mad persons' experiences represent sites of/for learning holding deep knowledge and value. ″Mad studies represents an evolving interdisciplinary field in which Mad studies scholars often  seek  to  disrupt,  counter,  and  nuance  dominant  discourses  on  mental  health.″ As such, Mad Studies informed pedagogical approaches emphasize Mad persons' perspectives as a way to counter sanist oppression and reshape curriculum to better appreciate and understand Mad subjects.  Thereby refuting a pedagogy of saneness  and opening new possibilities. Teaching from a Mad Studies informed lens requires unlearning normativity, rethinking sanist paradigms, and represents a disruptive critical praxis

Conferences and symposiums 
 June 12–15, 2008, Simon Fraser University, Madness, Citizenship, and Social Justice Conference
 May 2012, Ryerson University, International Conference on Mad Studies
 September 9–11, 2014, Lancaster University, Disability Studies Conference (stream that focused on Mad Studies)
 May 2015, Bergen, Norway, Nordic Network for Disability Research, Mad Studies Symposium
 June 17, 2015, Liverpool, UK, PsychoPolitics in the Twenty First Century: Peter Sedgwick and Radical Movements in Mental Health 
 June 2015, Lancaster University, Mad Studies and Neurodiversity- Exploring Connections
 September 30 - October 1, 2015, Durham University, UK, Making Sense of Mad Studies
 September 6–8, 2016, Lancaster University, Disability Studies Conference (stream that focused on Mad Studies)
 September 11–13, 2018, Lancaster University, Disability Studies Conference (stream that focused on Mad Studies)

Key texts

 This is Survivor Research (2009)
 Mad at School: Rhetorics of Mental Disability and Academic Life (2011)
 Mad Matters: A Critical Reader in Canadian Mad Studies (2013)
 Psychiatry Disrupted: Theorizing Resistance and Crafting the (R)evolution (2014)
 Decolonizing Global Mental Health: The Psychiatrization of the Majority World (2014) 
 Disability Incarcerated: Imprisonment and Disability in the United States and Canada (2014) 
 Madness, Distress, and the Politics of Disablement (2015)
 Psychiatry and the Business of Madness: An Ethical and Epistemological Accounting (2015)
 Searching for a Rose Garden: Challenging Psychiatry, Fostering Mad Studies (2016)
 Deportation and the Confluence of Violence within Forensic Mental Health and Immigration Systems (2015)

References

Identity politics
Interdisciplinary subfields of sociology
Abnormal psychology